Alus or ALUS may refer to:
Alu sequence
Arithmetic logic units (often abbreviated as "ALUs")
Alus, Iran, a village in Iran
Alus, alternate name for Malek Alus, a village in Iran
Alus (Thessaly), a town of ancient Thessaly, Greece
Alus (singer),  American singer, songwriter